Jimmy Connors was the defending champion and won in the final 7–6, 4–6, 6–3 against Raúl Ramírez.

Seeds

  Jimmy Connors (champion)
  Manuel Orantes (quarterfinals)
  Arthur Ashe (second round)
  Raúl Ramírez (final)
  Ken Rosewall (third round)
  Brian Gottfried (quarterfinals)
  Eddie Dibbs (quarterfinals)
  Onny Parun (first round)

Draw

Finals

Top half

Section 1

Section 2

Bottom half

Section 3

Section 4

External links
 Main draw

Singles